Arif ( also spelled Aref in Pashto, Persian & Urdu, or Arief in Indonesian and Malay) is an Arabic male given name that is common in Eritrea, Ethiopia, Saudi Arabia and Yemen. It later spread to other Muslim countries, such as Afghanistan, Bangladesh, Bosnia and Herzegovina, Iran, Indonesia, Malaysia, Pakistan and Turkey as well as among Muslims in India. In early Islam it can also refer to a man who has been taught customary law and entrusted with certain duties: distributing stipends to the warriors, collecting blood money, guarding the interest of orphans, and assisting in controlling of the markets.

Given name

Aarif
Aarif Barma (born 1959), Hong Kong judge
Aarif Rahman, Hong Kong actor
Aarif Sheikh (born 1997), Nepalese cricketer

Aref
Aref al-Aref, Palestinian journalist and politician
Aref Arefkia, Iranian pop singer
Aref al-Dajani, Palestinian politician
Aref Durvesh, Indian musician
Aref Qazvini, Iranian poet

Arief
Arief Budiman, Indonesian political activist
Arief Hidayat (born 1956), Indonesian judge
Arief Rachadiono Wismansyah (born 1977), Indonesian businessman, politician and mayor of Tangerang
Arief Yahya (born 1961), Indonesian businessman, politician and government minister

Arif
Arif Alaftargil (born 1973), Turkish alpine skier
Arif Aziz, Azerbaijan artist and educator
Arif Defri Arianto, Indonesian singer
Arif Dirlik, Turkish historian
Arif Erdem, Turkish footballer
Arif Heralić, Bosnian metal worker
Arif Karaoğlan, Turkish-German footballer
Arif Mardin, Turkish-American music producer
Arif Mohammad Khan, Indian politician and current governor of Kerala
Arif Pašalić, Bosnian military officer
Arif Sağ, Turkish singer
Arif Şentürk, Turkish singer
Arif Bilal Shahid, Ethiopian-American Actor/Comedian
Arif Susam, Turkish singer
Benjamin Arif Dousa, president of Sweden's Moderata ungdomsförbundet
Arif Wazir, Pakistani politician and leader of the Pashtun Tahafuz movement
Muhammad Arif Sufi, Muslim alias of Malaysian convicted murderer Micheal Anak Garing
Arif Zahir, American actor, rapper, singer, songwriter, and voice impressionist

References 

Arabic masculine given names
Bosniak masculine given names
Bosnian masculine given names
Turkish masculine given names
Pakistani masculine given names